The National Parks in Vietnam are officially recognized by the Government of Vietnam through decrees. Normally, the national parks located in the territory of multiple provinces and cities are managed by the Ministry of Agriculture and Rural Development, while the national parks located within the boundary of a province or city are managed by the People's Committee of the province or of the city. 

The national parks in Vietnam, stretching from the Northern borders to the Southern remote islands, are set up in order to protect the natural ecosystems, flora and fauna, diverse natural landscapes, such as the subtropical rain forests, in Phia Oắc-Phia Đén, the sub-alpine subtropical forests, the evergreen tropical forests to the coastal mangrove forests of Xuân Thủy, Cát Bà, and Mũi Cà Mau, and the melaleuca forests on peat in U Minh Thượng and U Minh Hạ.

Currently, Vietnam has 34 national parks. Cúc Phương is the first national park and was established in 1966 in the area of 3 provinces: Ninh Bình, Thanh Hóa and Hòa Bình. Meanwhile, the latest national park established is Song Thanh (Sông Thanh), setup on December 18, 2020, located in Quảng Nam province. Phong Nha-Kẻ Bàng is the national park with the largest area, while the mangrove forests in Xuân Thủy National Park are the national park with the smallest area.

Phong Nha-Kẻ Bàng is the only national park in Vietnam recognized by UNESCO as a World Heritage Site (since 2003). In addition, part of Bái Tử Long National Park is also included in the World Heritage Site of Hạ Long Bay. Some other national parks are also on the tentative list of UNESCO Heritage sites, such as Cát Tiên and Cát Bà National Parks on Cát Bà Island, as well as Ba Bể National Park which is a part of the Ba Bể-Na Hang Natural Heritage site. Another proposed heritage site of Vietnam is Con Moong Cave located in Cúc Phương National Park.

List of national parks in Vietnam

●
Ba Bể
●
Hoàng Liên
●
Tam Đảo
●
Ba Vì
●
Xuân Sơn
●
Xuân Thủy
●
Cúc Phương
●
Bến En
●
Cát Bà
●
Bái Tử Long
●
Pù Mát
●
Vũ Quang
●
Phong Nha-Kẻ Bàng
●
Bạch Mã
●
Chư Mom Ray
●
Kon Ka Kinh
●
Chư Yang Sin
●
Yok Đôn
●
Bidoup Núi Bà
●
Phước Bình
●
Núi Chúa
●
Bù Gia Mập
●
Lò Gò-Xa Mát
●
Cát Tiên
●
Tràm Chim
●
U Minh Thượng
●
U Minh Hạ
●
Mũi Cà Mau
●
Côn Đảo
●
Phú Quốc

See also  
National park
List of World Heritage Sites in Vietnam

References

External links

National Parks & Nature Reserves of Vietnam (in Vietnamese)

National parks
Vietnam
National parks